Mera Haque is a 1986 Indian Hindi-language action film directed by Ajay Kashyap, produced by Bobby Raj. It was released on 28 November 1986. It starred Sanjay Dutt in a dual role after the hit Jaan Ki Baazi, which had been released the previous year, with Anita Raj in pivotal roles.

Cast

 Sanjay Dutt as Prince Amar Singh/Ameru Dada (Dual Role)
 Anita Raj as  Bijli
 Gulshan Grover as Diwan's son
 Bindu as Ranimaa
 Shakti Kapoor as Dhartiprasad
 Ramesh Deo as Diwanji
 Raza Murad as Police Inspector Khan/ Jaggu Dada
 Jagdish Raj

Soundtrack

External links

1980s Hindi-language films
1986 films
Films scored by Anu Malik
Films directed by Ajay Kashyap